Vogošća is a town and a municipality located in Sarajevo Canton of the Federation of Bosnia and Herzegovina, an entity of Bosnia and Herzegovina. The municipality is located about 6 kilometers north of the city of Sarajevo and is its secondary suburb, after Ilidža. According to the 2013 census, the town has a population of 10,568 inhabitants, with 26,343 inhabitants in the municipality.

History
Vogošća greatly prospered during the 1980s, as part of Sarajevo’s great boom in the latter half of the 20th century. It grew to prominence in large part due to its automobile manufacturing industry, having deals with German and Swedish companies, including Volkswagen Group. By the late 1980s, it was the second most industrious and productive municipality in the former Yugoslavia.

Vogošća was heavily damaged during the exodus of the Serbs who controlled that territory during the war while its Bosniak population was expelled. The Dayton Agreement provided Vogošća to be a part of the Federation of Bosnia and Herzegovina. Today, Vogošća is rebuilding and its industries are on the rebound thanks to aid and funds.

Demographics

1971
According to the 1971 population census there were 14,402 residents.
6,728 Serbs (46.71%)
5,938 Bosniaks (41.23%)
1,186 Croats (8.23%)
247 Yugoslavs (1.71%)
303 Others (2.12%)

1991
According to the 1991 population census there were 24,647 residents.     
12,499 Bosniaks (50.71%)
8,813 Serbs (35.75%)
1,071 Croats (4.34%)
1,730 Yugoslavs (7.01%)
534 Others (2.19%)

2013
Population and ethnicity by settlement:

Twin towns – sister cities

Vogošća is twinned with:
 Çekmeköy, Turkey
 İzmit, Turkey

References

Official results from the book: Ethnic composition of SR Bosnia-Herzegovina population, by municipalities and settlements, 1991. census, Zavod za statistiku Bosne i Hercegovine - Bilten no.234, Sarajevo 1991.

External links

 
Populated places in Vogošća